"I Ain't Goin' Out Like That" is a 1993 song by American hip hop group Cypress Hill, released as the third single from their second studio album, Black Sunday (1993). During a scheduled Saturday Night Live performance, the song was cut short and the group was banned after DJ Muggs lit up a cannabis joint on-air just before the song. It contains a sample of the opening bars (played on a harmonica) from Black Sabbath's song "The Wizard". It was revealed that the band was high on mushrooms when this final track of the album was recorded.

Critical reception
Pete Stanton from Smash Hits gave "I Ain't Goin' Out Like That" four out of five, adding, "This tune is more pumping beats and jump-up-and-down raps."

Cover versions
In 1996, the song was covered by 16Volt for the electro-industrial various artists compilation Operation Beatbox.

Track listing

Charts

Weekly charts

Year-end charts

Credits and personnel
 B-Real – vocals
 Sen Dog – vocals
 DJ Muggs – arranger, executive producer, mixing, scratching/turntables
 T-Ray – production

References

Cypress Hill songs
1993 songs
1993 singles
Ruffhouse Records singles
Columbia Records singles
Songs written by Geezer Butler
Songs written by Tony Iommi
Songs written by Ozzy Osbourne
Songs written by Bill Ward (musician)
Songs written by DJ Muggs
Songs written by B-Real
Music Week number-one dance singles